Semantic analysis may refer to:

Language
Semantic analysis (linguistics)
Semantic analysis (computational)
Semantic analysis (machine learning)
Semantic Analysis (book), 1960, by Paul Ziff, on aesthetics/philosophy of language

Other ontologies
Semantic analytics of organisations
Semantic analysis (knowledge representation) of Web content

Other uses
Semantic analysis of audio
Semantic analysis (computer science)
Semantic analysis (compilers)